List of films and television series that have been filmed or set in and around Harrisburg, Pennsylvania, in the United States:
8 MM (feature film, 1999)
 Bob Roberts (feature film, 1992) 
 Broadway Limited (feature film, 1941) - filmed at Harrisburg's train station 
 The China Syndrome (feature film, 1979) - was not inspired by the Three Mile Island incident in 1979, but did help the public realize and fear what could have resulted from the incident
 The Colbert Report (TV series) - featured a segment on a repo man in Harrisburg; Colbert also commonly makes fun of and once featured Governor Ed Rendell on the show
 The Distinguished Gentleman (feature film, 1992)
 Frasier (TV series)- when Frasier is watching an episode of Antiques Roadshow, the announcer says, "Here's a shot of the city of Harrisburg"
 Girl, Interrupted (feature film 1999) 
 Hollywood, Pa. (independent film, 1999) - filmed in Harrisburg and Lancaster 
 The Light in the Forest (feature film, 1958)
 Lucky Numbers (feature film, 2000) - takes place in Harrisburg 
 Made In U.S.A.  (feature film, 1987) - Chris Penn, Lori Singer, Adrian Pasdar;   filmed in Harrisburg and Lemoyne
 Major League II (feature film, 1994)
 Mannequin (feature film, 1987) 
 National Lampoon's Animal House (feature film, 1978) - character Kent Dorfman is described as "a legacy from Harrisburg"; although the original film does not mention the location of the fictional city or college, DVD "extras" reveal that Faber is somewhere in Pennsylvania
 The Office (TV series) - in season 7, episode 4, Dwight says that he drops off day laborers in Harrisburg and tells them it is Canada (Sex Ed (The Office))
 The Remarkable Mr. Pennypacker (feature film, 1959) - set in Harrisburg and Philadelphia 
 The Simpsons (TV series, 1997–1998) - Harrisburg was mentioned in episode 179 of season nine 
 "U.S. Marshals" (feature film, 1998) - fugitive Mark Roberts (Wesley Snipes) is said to be in Harrisburg, PA
 Stolen Honor (documentary film, 2004) - anti-John Kerry film produced by Carlton Sherwood, a project of Red, White and Blue Productions based in Harrisburg
 Taking Lives (feature film, 2004) - partially filmed and set in Carlisle
 Thomas and the Magic Railroad (feature film, 2000) - filmed in Harrisburg and Strasburg
 The Vendors (short film, 2005) - filmed in Harrisburg, submitted to national and international film festivals

Films and television series filmed/set in nearby locations

 The Amish and Us' (documentary film, 1998) 
 Banshee (television series, 2013) - set in Pennsylvania Amish country, featured Harrisburg-based WHTM News
 The Coroner: I Speak for the Dead (television series, 2016- ) - features murder cases as solved by Dauphin County coroner Graham Hetrick
 For Richer or Poorer (feature film, 1997) - partially set in Intercourse, Lancaster County
 Gettysburg (feature film, 2001)
 Gods and Generals (feature film, 2003) - set in Gettysburg
 Grand (television series, 1990)  - set in a fictional Pennsylvania town some exterior establishing shots were filmed in the Harrisburg area
 One Life to Live (soap opera, 1968–2012, 2013–2014) - opening credits (1984-1991) featured prominent views of the Harrisburg skyline
 Scotland, Pa. (feature film, 2001)
 Witness (feature film, 1985) - filmed in Intercourse, Lancaster County
 X-Men Origins: Wolverine (feature film, 2009) - final fight scene set at Three Mile Island Nuclear Generating Station, south of Harrisburg.
 Black Mirror'' Season 4 Episode 2 Arkangel features a 717 area code setting it in the greater Harrisburg area.

See also
List of Pennsylvania films and television shows

References 

Films shot in Pennsylvania
Film and television